State Road 789 (SR 789) is a 17.5-mile-long road along the Florida’s Gulf Coast that spans Bird Key, St. Armands Key, and Lido Key, in Sarasota; Longboat Key (as Gulf of Mexico Drive); and Anna Maria Island.  The southern terminus is the intersection of the John Ringling Causeway and the Tamiami Trail (US 41-SR 45) in Sarasota; the northern terminus is the intersection of Gulf Drive, North and Manatee Avenue., West (SR 64) in Holmes Beach. Much of the northernmost five miles (8 km) has been designated Bradenton Beach Scenic Highway.

Additional sights along SR 789 include Ken Thompson Park (featuring Mote Aquarium on City Island), and the scenery of Gulf of Mexico Drive as it travels the length of Longboat Key.

Route description

SR 789 begins at an intersection with US 41/SR 45 in Sarasota, Sarasota County, heading west on North Gulfstream Avenue, a four-lane divided highway. The road runs to the north of Sarasota Bay before passing through an area of high-rise residential buildings. The state road curves southwest and becomes the John Ringling Causeway, crossing over Sarasota Bay on the Ringling Bridge. SR 789 runs across the northern part residential Bird Key before crossing more of the bay and heading onto St. Armand's Key. At this point, the roadway becomes John Ringling Boulevard and heads into commercial areas. SR 789 reaches the St. Armand's Circle and turns northwest onto Boulevard of the Presidents. The road passes homes before crossing a channel and narrowing into two-lane undivided John Ringling Parkway as it heads through areas of trees. The state road enters residential areas and curves northeast before turning to the northwest and heading over a drawbridge and heading into Longboat Key. Here, SR 789 becomes Gulf of Mexico Drive and passes between homes to the northeast and the Longboat Key Golf Club to the southwest. The road continues to the northwest, running between more residences to the northeast and resorts fronting the Gulf of Mexico to the southwest. Farther northwest, the state road heads through resort development on a narrow barrier island with the Gulf of Mexico to the southwest and Sarasota Bay to the northeast.

SR 789 crosses into Manatee County and continues through more resort residential and commercial development in Longboat Key. Farther northwest, the road turns to the north and comes to a drawbridge over Longboat Pass. At this point, the state road heads onto Anna Maria Island and becomes Gulf Drive South, passing through areas of trees. SR 789 enters Bradenton Beach and heads into areas of resort homes and businesses, with the beach along the Gulf of Mexico immediately to the west of the road. The road comes to an intersection with the western terminus of SR 684 and becomes Gulf Drive North, heading through more resort areas. The state road briefly curves northwest before heading north again and crossing into Holmes Beach. Here, SR 789 becomes East Bay Drive and passes through areas of homes and businesses with some woods to the east of the road before coming to its northern terminus at an intersection with SR 64.

Major intersections

Bridges

John Ringling Causeway 
The John Ringling Causeway is a bridge that extends past the Sarasota Bay, from Sarasota to St. Armands Key and Lido Key. The 65-foot-tall (20 m) bridge, built in 2003, is a segmental box girder bridge named after John Ringling, one of the founders of the Ringling Brothers Circus and resident of the Sarasota area.

New Pass Bridge 
The New Pass Bridge is a single-leaf bascule bridge that crosses the New Pass, connecting Sarasota and Longboat Key, Florida. The bascule bridge carries John Ringling Parkway, part of SR 789, and it was built in 1986, replacing the original bridge built in 1929.

Longboat Pass Bridge 
The Longboat Pass Bridge is a single-leaf bascule bridge that crosses the Longboat Pass, connecting Longboat Key and Bradenton Beach, Florida. The bridge also carries Gulf of Mexico Drive, part of SR 789. It was built in 1957, replacing an old swing bridge built in 1921.

References

External links
Bradenton Beach Scenic Highway (Florida Scenic Highways)

789
789
789
SR 789
Sarasota, Florida